The MICEX 10 Index is an unweighted price index that tracks the ten most liquid Russian stocks listed on Moscow Exchange. Composition of the index is assessed quarterly following the liquidity criterion. Components are assigned equal weight.

Calculation
The index is the arithmetic average of the change of prices between a time  and a base time 0, which is the end of the preceding quarter. The formula is:

Components

As of June 2017, the composition of the index was the following:

References

Russian stock market indices